are vernacular houses constructed in any one of several traditional Japanese building styles.
In the context of the four divisions of society,  were the dwellings of farmers, artisans, and merchants (i.e., the three non-samurai castes).

 are characterized by their basic structure, their roof structure, and their roof shape.  developed through history with distinctive styles emerging in the Edo period.

Types

The term  literally means houses of the people. It covers houses that accommodated a wide variety of people from farmers to village headmen, merchants and low level samurai.

 come in a wide range of styles and sizes, largely as a result of differing geographic and climatic conditions as well as the lifestyle of the inhabitants. They generally fall into one of four classifications: farmhouses  town houses , fishermen's dwellings  and mountain dwellings .

 The 'inverted U' consists of two vertical posts fixed at the top with a horizontal beam; these units can then be joined with side girders. The beam can be fixed to the top of the post either by resting upon it or via a mortise and tenon joint.
 The 'ladder' has post and beam units connected with larger beams including beams that are closer to the foundation level. This form of structure originated in townhouses of the Edo period. The system allows the irregular placement of posts and, therefore, allows flexibility in the plan. 
 With the 'umbrella' style, four beams radiate out from a central post. These posts sit at the centre of the square rather than the corners.  of this type are often found in Shiga Prefecture.
 The 'cross' has two beams at right angles to one another with the posts in the centre of the sides. It is often used for very small  that have no other posts erected in the space or for large  in the earth-floored area. The style is most often found in Shiga and Fukui prefectures. 
 'Parallel crosses' are found in Shizuoka Prefecture and cover an area 5 metres by 10 metres. This system doubles up the 'cross' structure with two crosses and eight posts.
 The 'box' structure connects four or more post and beam units to create a box-like structure. It was devised in the Edo period and can be found in Toyama and Ishikawa prefectures. 
 The 'interconnected box' can be found in Kyoto and Osaka. 
 'Rising beams' is a form that enables better use of the second storey. It uses beams that rise from the posts to a secondary ridge that is below the one formed by the rafters.
 Thatched roof farmhouses based upon the 'rising beam' structure can be further classified into four major types.

The  style has rafters, crossbeams and short vertical posts to support the ridge. Historically, these posts would have extended to the ground resulting in a row of posts extending down the centre of the house and dividing it. Although these could be accommodated in the layout of the main house, they were impractical in the earth-floored entrance area—so they were omitted and a special beam structure used instead. This style was in wide use until the Edo period when a shift was made to the  style (although both types had been used since historic times).

The  style is a simpler triangular shape with a pair of rafters joined at the top to support the ridge pole. The ends of these rafters were sharpened to fit into mortice holes at either end of crossbeam. As this system does not rely on central posts it leaves a more unobstructed plan than the  style.

Design of the floor plan

The  method uses a standard size of  mat, whereas the  method is based upon column spacing.

The  method works well for  without central columns as the mats and the sliding partitions ( and ) can be based on a standard size. The method has its disadvantages if used with posts because variations in post width can make the prefabrication of the sliding partitions difficult.

The  method is based upon the distance between centre of one post and centre of the post adjacent to it and it was mainly used on the eastern side of Japan.

Overall construction

 were influenced by local building techniques and were built with materials that were abundant in the immediate locality. For example,  in Shizuoka used abundant bamboo for roofs, eaves, doors and floors. When miscanthus reeds were difficult to obtain for thatched roofs, shingles were used instead; in volcanic areas rushes or boards were used instead of clay for the walls.

Climate had a bearing on construction: In Kyoto in the late Heian and Muromachi periods, roofs were clad in thin wooden shingles so owners would put stones on top to prevent the shingles from flying away in the wind.

The social status of the  owner was indicated by the size and complexity of the building. For thatched roof  the number of crossed wooden members or bundles of miscanthus reeds along the ridge are a good indicator of the importance of the owner's status in the village. For , the presence and elaborateness of an —a wall that projects above the roof line—has a similar status. The  inherited the function of a fire break, but initially it was a method of establishing the extent of ownership in long terraces of row houses.

Thatched roofs were replaced with tiles and exposed timbers were covered up with layers of clay plastering.

 owned by people of a higher social status began to incorporate elements of the shoin style, particularly in living rooms. The types of elements incorporated were limited by sumptuary laws to preserve strict class distinctions.

Roofing

Most  have gabled  roofs, covered in shingles or tiles, and slanting down on either side of the house. The majority of  have either thatched -style hipped roofs, which slant down on four sides, or the more elaborate  roof with multiple gables and a combination of thatched sections and shingled sections. Finally, the  also slopes in four directions but is more pyramidal in shape.

The primary purpose of shaping  roofs was to accommodate the extensive precipitation experienced in many parts of Japan. A steeply peaked roof allows rain and snow to fall straight off, preventing water from getting through the roof into the home and, to a lesser extent, preventing the thatch from getting too wet and beginning to rot.

At the peak and other places where roof sections came together decorations were added. Thatched roofs would have trimmed or transverse layers of straw, bamboo poles or planks of wood. Tiled roofs have a variety of decorative plates to the ends of the ridge, for example,  (fish). They also had circular plates to the ends of the tiles at the eaves called  that helped to deflect rain.

Farmhouse interior

The deep eaves of the farmhouse roof helped to protect the interior from driving rain. They stop the sun from entering the interior during the summer, and they allow the low rays of sun to warm the house during the winter. Often there is a timber-floored veranda around the house under the eaves and protected on the outside by storm shutters. In areas where there is heavy snow there may be a lowered earth-floored area outside the veranda further protected by shutters which helps to stop snow from blowing inside.

In older houses, like the 17th century Yoshimura house, this separating zone was up to 2.5 m wide and servants apparently slept there.

Above the ash-filled hearth would hang a kettle suspended from the ceiling by an adjustable hearth hook made of wood, metal and bamboo. This  could be raised or lowered depending on the amount of heat required and was often shaped into decorative fish or blade shapes. There was no chimney in the farmhouse and the smoke from the irori would rise through the roof drying the reeds and deterring insects. The  was the centre of communication for the house where the family gathered to chat and eat, and it was a cozy place around which to sleep.

The arrangement and size of these rooms was made more flexible with the use of sliding fusuma and shōji partitions.

The social status of the owner of house governed the conventions of their social relationships in the house. The requirements for social etiquette extended to the family and there were particular seating positions positioned around the hearth.

Typical Edo period farmhouses

A number of styles of farmhouses came to maturity during the Edo period; some typical examples follow.

Gasshou

The -style  have vast roofs that are a large form of the  structural system. Their name derives from the similarity of the roof shape to two hands in prayer. They are frequently found in Gifu Prefecture. The upper floors of the two- and three-story houses are used for sericulture, with storage space for trays of silkworms and mulberry leaves.

Honmune

 literally means "true ridge": The style has a nearly square plan with a gabled roof that is board covered. The gable end of the house is particularly impressive with its composition of beams, eaves and braces. Houses of this type can be found in Gunma, Nara, Yamaguchi and Kouchi prefectures.

Preservation

 are generally treated as historic landmarks, and many have been designated for preservation by municipalities or the national government. The tremendous regional variation of  has also been preserved in open-air museums such as Nihon Minka-en in Kawasaki, where examples from around Japan are on display. Minka have also been used as hotels and restaurants to be preserved.

One  that belonged to the Yonezu family was acquired by the JMRA and donated to Kew Gardens as part of the Japan 2001 Festival. The wooden structure was dismantled, shipped and re-assembled in Kew with new walls and a thatched roof.

See also
 Historic Villages of Shirakawa-gō and Gokayama
 Nihon Minka-en
 A-frame house
 Machiya

Footnotes

References
 
 
 
Japan Live. (2020). Komika. 2nd ed.

Further reading
Suzuki Mitsuru (1985). "Minka." Kodansha Encyclopedia of Japan. Tokyo: Kodansha Ltd.
Taro Sakamoto, et al. (1964). Fuzoku jiten (A Dictionary of Popular Culture). Tokyo: KK Tokyodō

External links
The Herbert Offen Research Collection of the Phillips Library at the Peabody Essex Museum
Definition of Minka at JAANUS

Architecture in Japan
Japanese home
Timber framed buildings
Vernacular architecture
Thatched buildings